The Kommunistische Partei Deutschlands (Aufbauorganisation) (KPD (AO), Communist Party of Germany (Pre-Party Formation)) was a West German Maoist group founded in 1970. It changed its name to the Kommunistische Partei Deutschlands (KPD) a year later.

In 1973 KPD members occupied and vandalized Bonn's city hall to protest a visit by South Vietnam's Prime Minister. By 1974 it was West Germany's most significant Maoist party, with 5,000 members. About a quarter of its members were women. It dissolved in 1980.

Jörg Immendorff illustrated some of their publications.

Members
Dieter Kunzelmann
Horst Mahler

References

1970 establishments in West Germany
1980 disestablishments in West Germany
Anti-revisionist organizations
Defunct communist parties in Germany
Defunct Maoist parties
Far-left politics in Germany
Maoist organisations in Germany